The Kintyre Goose Roosts are a group of five oligotrophic hill lochs on the Kintyre peninsula in Argyll and Bute, western Scotland. With a total area of 312 hectares, they have been protected as a Ramsar Site since 1998.

The roosts include Loch Garasdale, Loch an Fhraoich, Loch Lussa, Tangy Loch and Black Loch. These support an  internationally important population of Greenland white-fronted geese, with 8.5% of the population over-wintering at the site. Tangy Loch is also notable for the presence of the nationally rare slender naiad (Najas flexilis).

As well as being recognised as a wetland of international importance under the Ramsar Convention, Kintyre Goose Roosts has also been designated a Special Protection Area and a Site of Special Scientific Interest.

References

Ramsar sites in Scotland
Sites of Special Scientific Interest in Kintyre
Wetlands of Scotland